Schela is a commune in Gorj County, Oltenia, Romania. It is composed of five villages: Arsuri, Gornăcel, Păjiștele, Sâmbotin (the commune centre) and Schela.

References

Communes in Gorj County
Localities in Oltenia